Que Hill (possibly named after the legendary physician Bian Que for whom there is a memorial tomb nearby) is a small elongated hill located on the western shore of the Yellow River in the City of Jinan, Shandong Province, China. It is one of the solitary "Nine Hills" in the Yellow River valley within and to the north of Jinan City. Together with Hua Hill, which is today located on the opposite side of the Yellow River, Que Hill is depicted in a renowned painting by the Yuan-Dynasty era painter and calligrapher Zhao Mengfu entitled "Autumn Colors at Que and Hua Hills" (now in the collection of the National Palace Museum in Taipeh). The hill is positioned close to the northern end of the Luokou Yellow River Railway Bridge which was placed there because the hill stabilizes the course of the Yellow River. In November 1937, Japanese troops attacked the northern shore of the Yellow River and killed about 50 villagers who lived around Que Hill. The event became known as the Que Hill Tragedy.

See also
List of sites in Jinan

References

Landforms of Shandong
Hills of China